Underworld: Evolution is a 2006 American action horror film directed by Len Wiseman. It is a sequel to the 2003 film Underworld and is the second installment in the Underworld franchise. The plot follows Selene and Michael, again played by Kate Beckinsale and Scott Speedman, respectively, as they fight to protect the Corvinus bloodline from its hidden past.

Plot
In 1202, an army led by the three vampire elders (Markus, Viktor, and Amelia) arrives at a village full of Werewolves and capture their target: Markus's twin brother, William Corvinus, the first and most powerful werewolf. Despite Markus's defiance, Viktor orders that William be imprisoned in a secret location forever.

In the present day, Markus awakens and kills regent Kraven. Alexander Corvinus, A.K.A Lorenz Macaro, the forefather to both the vampire and Lycan races, sends in a team of "cleaners" to investigate the aftermath from the battle in the Lycans' lair. Macaro examines Viktor's corpse and finds a metal disc inside; it is the match to a pendant originally worn by Sonja. Michael obtained the other half of the pendant after the death of Lucian.

Meanwhile, vampiress Selene takes Michael to a safe house. Using the knowledge obtained from Kraven's blood, Markus tracks the pair down and attacks them, but they escape and hide in a warehouse. That night, Selene and Michael have passionate sexual intercourse. She later wakes up in the morning and recalls seeing the pendant as a child, but does not know its significance. Wanting to know why Markus wants it, the two travel to the hideout of the exiled vampire historian Andreas Tanis

Tanis reveals that Markus was the first vampire, one of the three sons of Macaro, the first immortal. Markus was bitten by a bat and metamorphosed into a vampire, while William was bitten by a wolf and became a werewolf. The third son remained human and gave rise to a line of mortal descendants including Michael, who turned into the first Lycan-Vampire hybrid. The first werewolves created by William were entirely animal and unable to return to their human forms. Due to William's destructiveness, Markus approached Viktor, then a dying mortal warlord, and offered to turn him and his army into vampires in exchange for tracking down and stopping William, and in destroying those he had infected. Tanis further reveals that Selene's father was the architect who built William's prison and that the pendant is the key. Viktor killed Selene's family because they knew the prison's location, but made Selene into a vampiress with the location of the prison encoded in her blood. After Selene and Michael leave, Markus arrives and drinks Tanis' blood to learn Selene and Michael's location, killing Tanis.

Selene and Michael visit Macaro, who refuses to assist Selene in killing his sons. Markus arrives, fights Michael and impales him. He learns the location of William's prison by drinking Selene's blood, mortally wounds his father and obtains the other half of the pendant. He intends, with William, to rule the world as the god-like master of a race of vampire-Lycan hybrids. On Macaro's bidding, Selene drinks his blood, enhancing her physical strength and healing abilities to a level equivalent to that of a hybrid. Afterwards, Macaro blows up his ship, killing himself.

Selene, aboard Macaro's helicopter, leads his cleaners to the prison to kill Markus, who has already freed William. In the ensuing battle, William bites the cleaners, turning them into werewolves. Michael, presumed dead, awakens and joins the fight, killing William by ripping his head off. Selene battles Markus and kills him by pushing him into the rotor blades of the cleaners' crashed helicopter.

After the battle, Selene realizes that Alexander's blood granted her hybrid abilities, including being immune to the effects of sunlight, which is lethal to vampires.

Cast

 Kate Beckinsale as Selene
 Lily Mo Sheen as young Selene
 Scott Speedman as Michael Corvin
 Tony Curran as Markus Corvinus
 Derek Jacobi as Alexander Corvinus/Lorenz Macaro
 Steven Mackintosh as Andreas Tanis
 Shane Brolly as Kraven
 Bill Nighy as Viktor
 Zita Görög as Amelia
 Brian Steele as William Corvinus
 Andrew Kavadas as Selene's Father
 Kayla Levins as Selene's Sister
 John Mann as Samuel

Reception

Box office
The film opened at #1 on 3,207 screens with a weekend box office (January 20–22, 2006) of $26.9 million, for an average of $8,388 per theater. As of March 12, 2006, the film had grossed a total of $62.3 million in the United States and $111.3 million worldwide.

Critical response
As of August 31, 2021, Underworld: Evolution has a 17% overall approval rating on Rotten Tomatoes based on 104 reviews. The site's consensus reads, "A visual and aural assault on the senses, this vampire-werewolf sequel makes a lot of noise and features a heavy-handed, overly convoluted story." Audiences polled by CinemaScore gave the film an average grade of "B+" on an A+ to F scale. A few scenes of the film were shown in a panel at Comic-Con in San Diego, in July 2005; however, these scenes did not contain any plot spoilers of the script, with attendees only being informed about the new hybrids by production designer Patrick Tatopoulos. The preview was well-received as hundreds of fans waited hours to see a clip of the film, as well as Kate Beckinsale and the other stars.

Jeannette Catsoulis of The New York Times criticized the film's "steel-blue filter" and described it as "a monotonous barrage of computer-generated fur and fangs." Peter Hartlaub of the San Francisco Chronicle began his review by saying, "you can tell that Underworld: Evolution is trying to be an artistic action-horror film, because every scene is bathed in the color blue," going on to say that the film is "an admirable attempt to test the boundaries of the genre," though is confusing and not fun to watch.

Music

Soundtrack

Track listing

Score

Home media
The film was released on DVD on June 6, 2006, and on Blu-ray on June 20, 2006.

Prequel and sequel
The next film in the series, the prequel Underworld: Rise of the Lycans, depicted the background history that led to the Vampire-Lycan War of the first and second films. A fourth and fifth film, the sequels to Underworld: Evolution, titled Underworld: Awakening and Underworld: Blood Wars, were released on January 20, 2012 and January 6, 2017, respectively.

See also
Vampire film

References

External links

 
 
 
 
 
 

2006 films
2006 horror films
2006 action thriller films
2000s monster movies
American supernatural horror films
American action thriller films
American action horror films
American dark fantasy films
American sequel films
2000s French-language films
Hungarian-language films
2
Films shot in Vancouver
Films shot in Budapest
Girls with guns films
American vampire films
American werewolf films
Fiction about familicide
Lakeshore Entertainment films
Screen Gems films
Films directed by Len Wiseman
Films scored by Marco Beltrami
Films produced by Tom Rosenberg
Films produced by Gary Lucchesi
2000s English-language films
2000s American films